Pukehangi  is a western suburb of Rotorua in the Bay of Plenty Region of New Zealand's North Island.

History

In 2017, Rotorua District Council identified Pukehangi as a key area for future residential development. An 89-section subdivision and a 33-section subdivision were both announced that year. More sections were due to become available in 2019.

In December 2018, landowners of farmland west of the suburb sought planning consent to develop new residential areas. The plan change was approved by the Rotorua District Council and Ministry for the Environment during 2019. It was opened up it to public submissions in January 2020.

In 2019, a Pukehangi rental home was the subject of a 7-month legal dispute between a landlord and tenant, which ended with the High Court terminating the tenancy.

Demographics

Pukehangi had a population of 5,277 at the 2018 New Zealand census, an increase of 390 people (8.0%) since the 2013 census, and an increase of 336 people (6.8%) since the 2006 census. There were 1,758 households, comprising 2,496 males and 2,778 females, giving a sex ratio of 0.9 males per female, with 1,362 people (25.8%) aged under 15 years, 1,080 (20.5%) aged 15 to 29, 2,151 (40.8%) aged 30 to 64, and 684 (13.0%) aged 65 or older.

Ethnicities were 65.5% European/Pākehā, 44.7% Māori, 5.7% Pacific peoples, 5.9% Asian, and 1.4% other ethnicities. People may identify with more than one ethnicity.

The percentage of people born overseas was 13.4, compared with 27.1% nationally.

Although some people chose not to answer the census's question about religious affiliation, 53.6% had no religion, 34.8% were Christian, 2.6% had Māori religious beliefs, 1.0% were Hindu, 0.5% were Buddhist and 1.2% had other religions.

Of those at least 15 years old, 528 (13.5%) people had a bachelor's or higher degree, and 861 (22.0%) people had no formal qualifications. 399 people (10.2%) earned over $70,000 compared to 17.2% nationally. The employment status of those at least 15 was that 1,911 (48.8%) people were employed full-time, 576 (14.7%) were part-time, and 285 (7.3%) were unemployed.

References

Suburbs of Rotorua
Populated places in the Bay of Plenty Region